Jalpaiguri Assembly constituency is an assembly constituency in Jalpaiguri district in the Indian state of West Bengal. It is reserved for scheduled castes.

Overview
As per orders of the Delimitation Commission, No. 17 Jalpaiguri Assembly constituency (SC) covers Jalpaiguri municipality, and Arabinda, Bahadur, Boalmari Nandanpur, Garalbari, Kharia, Kharija Berubari I, Kharija Berubari II, Mondalghat, Nagar Berubari and South Berubari gram panchayats of Jalpaiguri community development block,

Jalpaiguri Assembly constituency is part of No. 3 Jalpaiguri (Lok Sabha constituency) (SC).

Members of Legislative Assembly

Election results

2021 Election

2016 Election

2011
In the 2011 elections, Sukh Bilas Barma of Congress defeated his nearest rival Gobinda Chandra Roy of AIFB.

.# Swing calculated on Congress+Trinamool Congress vote percentages taken together in 2006.

1977-2006
In the 2006 state assembly elections, Deba Prasad Roy of Congress won the Jalpaiguri assembly seat defeating his nearest rival Gobinda Roy of Forward Bloc. Contests in most years were multi cornered but only winners and runners are being mentioned. In 2001, Gobinda Roy of Forward Bloc defeated Anupam Sen representing Trinamool Congress. Anupam Sen representing Congress defeated of Sudhansu Majumdar of Forward Bloc in 1996 and Nirmal Kumar Bose of Forward Bloc in 1991, Nirmal Kumar Bose of Forward Bloc defeated Anupam Sen of Congress in 1987 and 1982, and Devendra Mohan Sarkar of Janata Party in 1977.

1951–1972
Anupam Sen of Congress won in 1972 and 1971. Naresh Chandra Chakraborty of CPI won in 1969. Khagendra Nath Dasgupta of Congress won in 1967 and 1962. Prior to that Jalpaiguri was a joint seat. Sarojendra Deb Raikut and Khagendra Nath Dasgupta, both of Congress, won in 1957. In independent India's first election in 1951, Ashrumati Devi and Khagendra Nath Dasgupta, both of Congress, won.

References

Assembly constituencies of West Bengal
Politics of Jalpaiguri district
Jalpaiguri